Jozef T. (Joseph) Rechlicz (March 21, 1862September 23, 1921) was a Polish American immigrant, merchant, and Democratic politician.  He was a member of the Wisconsin State Assembly, representing the south side of the city of Milwaukee during the 1899 session.

Biography
Jozef Rechlicz was born in Poznań, in what is now western Poland.  At the time of his birth, the area was part of the Kingdom of Prussia.  As a child, he emigrated to the United States with his parents and came to Milwaukee, Wisconsin, in 1880.  He immediately went to work as a laborer at the E. P. Allis manufacturing company.  He remained there for many years and was promoted to work as a shipping clerk.

In he 1890s, he started his own business, operating a grocery and saloon.

He was active in the Polish American and Catholic communities in Milwaukee; he was secretary of the St. Stanislaus Mutual Aid Association, a co-founder of the Polish Association of America, and a member of the board of trustees of the United Catholic societies of the United States.

During the 1899 Wisconsin legislative session, incumbent state representative Albert Woyciechowski died of a sudden case of pneumonia.  Local Democrats quickly coalesced around Rechlicz as their choice to succeed Woyciechowski. A special election was held February 28, 1899, in which Rechlicz defeated Republican F. J. Holtz with 60% of the vote. He did not run for re-election in 1900.

Rechlicz died in Milwaukee on September 23, 1921.

Personal life and family
Rechlicz was a son of John Rechlicz and his wife Justina (née Brzezińska).  Jozef Rechlicz married Anna Kantak, also an immigrant from Polish Prussia. They had seven children, though three died in infancy and two others died relatively young.

References

1862 births
1921 deaths
19th-century American politicians
Polish emigrants to the United States
Politicians from Poznań
Politicians from Milwaukee
Democratic Party members of the Wisconsin State Assembly